FVG Project (PFVG) is a centre-right political party active in Friuli-Venezia Giulia, Italy.

The party was originally led by entrepreneur Sergio Bini, Ferruccio Saro and Marco Pottino. Saro is a former member of the Italian Socialist Party, Forza Italia and The People of Freedom, while Pottino a former leader of Lega Nord Friuli-Venezia Giulia. Now the president is Mauro Di Bert, and the regional coordinator is Sergio Bini.

In the 2018 Friuli-Venezia Giulia regional election the party obtained 6.29% of the vote and three regional councillors. Subsequently, Bini was appointed regional minister of Productive Activities and Tourism in Massimiliano Fedriga's government. In the Regional Council, PFVG formed a joint group with Responsible Autonomy.

For the 2023 Friuli-Venezia Giulia regional election, the coordinator Segio Bini decides to dissolve FVG Project and merger into Fedriga for President, the civic list that supports Massimiliano Fedriga.

Electoral results

Regional elections

Leadership
President: Mauro Di Bert
Regional coordinator: Sergio Bini
Treasurer: Enzo Gozzi

External links
Official website

References

Political parties in Friuli-Venezia Giulia